Chichester-Clark is a surname. Notable people include:
Emma Chichester Clark (born 1955), British children's book illustrator and author
James Chichester-Clark (1923–2002), penultimate Prime Minister of Northern Ireland
James Lenox-Conyngham Chichester-Clark (1884–1933), member of parliament 
Robin Chichester-Clark (1928–2016), member of parliament for Londonderry

See also
Chichester (disambiguation)
Clark (surname)

Compound surnames
English-language surnames
Surnames of English origin